A Tiempo (English: "On Time") is the sixth studio album by Peruvian singer-songwriter Gian Marco released by Sony Music Latin and Crescent Moon Records in December 2001 in Perú and April 9, 2002 for the rest of the world. It was his first album to be released Internationally.

Gian Marco earned his first 3 Latin Grammy nominations with this album.

Commercial Performance
The album was a success throughout Latin America and parts of Europe. In Spain the songs Se Me Olvidó, Te Mentiría, and Lamento entered the Los Principales radio airplay chart peaking at number 6, 27, and 38 respectively. Se Me Olvidó was the most successful in Spain peaking at number 4 in the official Spanish charts. It launched Gian Marco's career Internationally and in that same year he was nominated for three Latin Grammy Awards including Record of the Year and Best New Artist.

Reception
The album was praised by critics,  receiving three Latin Grammy Nominations, as well by other big names in the music industry such as Marc Anthony, Emilio Estefan, Jaci Velasquez, and Emmanuel.

Track listing
All credits adapted from AllMusic.

Certifications and Sales

Accolades
3rd Latin Grammy Awards

|-
|rowspan=3|2002
|style="text-align:center;"|Himself
|style="text-align:center;"|Best New Artist
|
|-
|style="text-align:center;"|A Tiempo
|style="text-align:center;"|Best Male Pop Vocal Album
|
|-
|style="text-align:center;"|Se Me Olvidó
|style="text-align:center;"|Record of the Year
|
|-

References

Gian Marco albums
2002 albums
Spanish-language albums